Rotenburg is a railway station located in Rotenburg an der Wümme, Germany. The station is located on the Wanne-Eickel–Hamburg railway, Bremervörde–Walsrode railway and Verden–Rotenburg railway. The train services are operated by Metronom and Eisenbahnen und Verkehrsbetriebe Elbe-Weser (EVB).

Train services
The following services currently call at the station:

Regional services  Bremen - Rotenburg - Tostedt - Buchholz - Hamburg
Local services  Bremen - Rotenburg - Tostedt - Buchholz - Hamburg
Local services  Rotenburg - Verden

References

Railway stations in Lower Saxony
Buildings and structures in Rotenburg (district)
Railway stations in Germany opened in 1874